The Jungle Book (Original Motion Picture Soundtrack) is the soundtrack album to the 2016 eponymous Disney film, which is a live-action/CGI adaptation of the 1967 animated film of the same name. Directed by Jon Favreau, the film features musical score composed and conducted by his frequent collaborator John Debney, mostly drawing from George Bruns' original music. Few of the tracks were incorporated from the 1967 film's soundtrack written by Sherman Brothers and Terry Gilkyson. The score was recorded at Los Angeles, California and New Orleans, with prominent players and large orchestral members recording the score. Walt Disney Records released the film's soundtrack on April 15, 2016. It received positive reviews for the musical score, as well as incorporated songs from the 1967 film, being well received. John Debney missed the nomination for Academy Award for Best Original Score, though at the Hollywood Music in Media Awards, he won Best Original Score – Sci-Fi/Fantasy Film as well as receiving a Satellite Award for Best Original Score nomination.

Background 

According to Debney, “Jon [Favreau] wanted a timeless sound to the score and I embraced that". Debney listened to the other versions of the Jungle Book soundtracks, including those for the 1967 and 1994 animated version, before working on the score, as they were so many iterations developed by other composers. Both Debney and Favreau wanted "classic Disney score with proper cultural influences", hence he imported tabla, Indian percussions, bamboo flutes and several other exotic instruments, in addition to the 104-piece orchestral members from Los Angeles Orchestra and a 50-member voice choir.

Initially, he wrote eight to ten themes for the score, which he showcased to Favreau. He created a theme for Mowgli, after several preliminary tunes, he composed, saying that "[i]t's not overly emotional. It has an elegance and majesty to it. He’s becoming a man through this whole experience and that’s what [Debney and Favreau] wanted to say with his theme". He called Mowgli's theme, as the "centerpiece of the score", since "the story is narrated from Mowgli’s point of view and is learning the lessons he needs to become a man". Shere Khan's theme was conformed of a three or four-note motif, while Baloo's "called for quirky strings and bass" that is "frolicking and emotional". While Bagheera doesn't have a theme of his own, he's represented by French horns and strings, and Kaa's music features snake-like sounds, while King Louie's features many instruments, like percussion instruments, bass marimbas, etc.

Debney brought world-renowned percussionists and orchestral players for recording in Los Angeles, as several instruments needed to be used in the action sequences, which are "rhythmic and fast-paced". After recording, he later augmented the cues withsome of the scores he created. According to him, " There’s an old Disney term called “Fantasound”, and many years ago—I think it was during Fantasia—they had experimented with stereophonic sound in the theater, which had never been done before. Jon wanted to come up with the contemporary version of that, sort of an extended or heightened Dolby Atmos mix, and that’s sort of what we did. We flew many sounds around the theater, more than I’ve done before, and just had a lot of fun with it—made the environment come alive, both with music and sound, to create these jungle environments."

While Richard M. Sherman, who originally co-wrote songs for the 1967 film with his brother Robert, was originally reported to be writing new songs for the remake, Favreau decided not to make the film a musical. Still, he and Debney incorporated several songs from the 1967 animated film. "The Bare Necessities", written by Terry Gilkyson, is performed by Murray and Sethi, and a cover version by Dr. John is featured in the end credits. "I Wan'na Be Like You" and "Trust in Me" — written by the Sherman Brothers - are performed by Walken and Johansson, respectively; Richard M. Sherman wrote revised lyrics for Walken's version of "I Wan'na Be Like You". Johansson's rendition of "Trust in Me" was produced by Mark Ronson and appears in the end credits only. About the inclusion of the tracks, Debney said in an interview to Deadline Hollywood: "If you didn’t include those songs, there probably would have been a riot in the theater. Then it became my job, honestly, to interpolate those and make them feel organic to the film. In terms of those themes and those songs, that was the job that I was given, to try and incorporate them and make them feel a part of this whole fabric of the film score." Used in trailers is the track "Take A Bow" by English alternative rock band, Muse, from their 2006 album, Black Holes and Revelations.

Critical reception 
James Southall of Movie Wave wrote "The Jungle Book may not quite be one of John Debney's very best but it’s not far from it, probably the best thing he’s done, since Lair – it’s an old-school (by old, I mean 1990s) adventure romp full of memorable melody, wit and charm, not to mention great compositional technique.  At times it’s the closest thing to a Jerry Goldsmith score we’ve had, not just in the specifics of how the main theme sounds but in the construction of the action music (with a dollop of James Newton Howard in there too), and while as a result it’s certainly not the most original film score, it’s faultlessly entertaining from start to finish, with never a dull moment.  Those of a certain vintage are going to absolutely love it." Critic Jonathan Broxton wrote "The Jungle Book is one of the most accomplished scores of John Debney’s career.

Charts

Track listing

Notes

References 

2016 soundtrack albums
The Jungle Book (franchise)
Disney film soundtracks
Walt Disney Records soundtracks
Adventure film soundtracks
Drama film soundtracks
John Debney soundtracks